Cardinal Newman Roman Catholic Comprehensive School is an English speaking Roman Catholic comprehensive school in the village of Rhydyfelin near Pontypridd, in Rhondda Cynon Taf, Wales, United Kingdom.

Buildings

The school consists of 4 main buildings: 
Main Building: Reception area, Assembly Hall, Canteen, Gymnasium, Library, Staff Room, Physical Education Classrooms, Technology Department, Media Classrooms, Changing rooms,  History Department and Sixth Form Common Room
Double Storey Block: Upstairs - English, Geography. Downstairs - French, Italian, Art, Catering and Hospitality.
Science Building: Physics, Biology, Chemistry, Conference Room, Religious Education.
RE Block: Downstairs - Religious Education, Welsh, Café Area. Upstairs - ICT, Maths, Welsh Baccalaureate Area.
There is also an area with terrapins for instrument study, support staff offices, inclusion and nurture.

History
The school is named after Saint John Henry Newman (who was canonised on October 13, 2019). The school was opened in 1969.

Partnerships with the school
The school's previous consortium, which consisted of Pontypridd High School, Hawthorn High School and Cardinal Newman RC School, was dissolved after the end of the 2012-13 school year. It was replaced by a different consortium with the inclusion on a new college in Nantgarw, Cardiff which is located 2.2 miles away. This consortium consists of Cardinal Newman RC School, Coleg Morgannwg (later Coleg Y Cymoedd) and St David's Catholic College. This consortium ended following the 2017-2018 school year. It has been announced that a new partnership with St David’s Catholic College will begin after the sixth form's last intake in September 2021 due to it being the only R.C post 16 option available to learners after the sixth form ceases to operate.

The school has a partnership with a Ugandan school named Bukalasi. They have a few fundraising events to raise money for the school to help them build new buildings. The money is raised and send to the school via CAFOD. Teachers from each of the schools visit the other school around once per year.

Alumni
 Robert Earnshaw who attended the school between 1992 and 1997.
 Tommy O'Sullivan Current Colchester United Playmaker.
 Fionn McLoughlin Irish Rugby Union Player, ex Shannon RUFC, Pontypridd RUFC currently with Royal Tunbridge Wells RUFC.

References

Secondary schools in Rhondda Cynon Taf
Catholic secondary schools in the Archdiocese of Cardiff
Educational institutions established in 1969
1969 establishments in Wales